The Saskatchewan Amateur Men's Golf Championship is an annual men's provincial golf championship sanctioned by Golf Saskatchewan.

The championship has been held since 1908. The annual champion is awarded the James Balfour Trophy, named after the former mayor of Regina, James Balfour. The top three competitors earn the opportunity to represent Saskatchewan in the Willingdon Cup team championship, while competing at the Canadian Amateur Championship.

Winners

Most wins

Source:

References 

Golf tournaments in Saskatchewan
Amateur golf tournaments in Canada
Recurring sporting events established in 1908
1908 establishments in Saskatchewan